was the first licensed female physician practicing Western medicine in Japan.

Life overview 
Ogino Ginko was born in Tawarase, in Musashi Province (present-day Kumagaya City, Saitama Prefecture). The Ogino’s were a respectable family as they had the responsibility of the headquarter of that area. She was the youngest of two brothers and five sisters.

She married in 1867 at the age of 16, in an arranged marriage, to Kanichiro Inamura. Ogino soon divorced her husband in 1870, after contracting gonorrhoea from him. The divorce had a major impact on her life, as her family was ashamed of having a divorced daughter affected by a venereal disease. Japanese society at the time looked upon divorced women with extreme disfavour, and furthermore, women affected by gonorrhoea were considered prostitutes, as it is a sexually transmitted infection.

After the embarrassment of having to visit male doctors with what was considered a “shameful” disease, she resolved to become a doctor herself, in order to help women in similar circumstances. In a women’s paper, she even described the inability of male doctors to tackle such a disease, highlighting how badly female doctors, as well as a more feminist culture, were needed.

In 1873, she moved to Tokyo to resume and complete her basic education at the school of Yorikuni Inoue, graduating in 1879 with full honours. This achievement was remarkable, as only 15 out of 74 female students from the school managed to complete the journey. In 1880, Ogino entered the medical school of Kojuin, becoming the first female student of the institution.

Afterward, she entered Tokyo Women's Normal School (present-day Ochanomizu University), which was at that time a private medical academy with an all-male student body. Despite all the prejudice and hardship, she managed to graduate in 1882. Still, it was only thanks to a series of petitions that she was finally allowed to take her medical practitioner's examination in 1885, with full marks. Shortly thereafter, she opened the Ogino Hospital in Yushima, specialising in obstetrics and gynecology to help women in their particular struggles. That same year, she became the first registered female doctor in Japan.

Ogino also served as staff doctor to the girls' school of Meiji Gakuin University, always professing for equality between men and women. During this period, Ogino grew closer to the Christian Church (Meiji Gakuin being a Christian university) and she reorganised her schedule in order to dedicate her spare time to voluntary work and church.

In 1890, Ogino married a Protestant clergyman and utopian visionary, Yukiyoshi Shikata, with whom she adopted the child of her husband’s sister, after the latter had died during a difficult birth in which Ogino tried to help as an obstetrician. After their marriage, she went with her new family to Hokkaido in 1894, where she ran a medical practice.

In 1906, after the death of her husband, Ogino returned to Tokyo where she resumed running a hospital. Back in Tokyo, she was so moved by the increasing numbers of new female doctors and women interested in female health, that in 1889 she not only founded, but she also became professor of the Woman's Christian Temperance Union (WCTU). Moreover, she was nominated secretary of an association working for ensuring women's health.

Ogino became one of the most important scientific figures of the Meiji period. She died in 1913.

The gonorrhoea period and the shifting towards Western Medicine 
Ogino Ginko first married in 1870, at the age of 16. Her first husband's name was Kanichiro Inamura. He was the firstborn of a wealthy and well-respected family, considering their role as assistants to magistrates since ancient times. The family used to live in Kawakami, Nagami Prefecture, 300 km from Tokyo.

During his youth, Kanichiro contracted gonorrhoea. He later transmitted this infection to his wife during their marriage, which lead to their divorce.

Years later, Kanichiro Inamura became founder and president of Ashikaga Bank.

This period was a turning point for Ogino. Through this phase of her life, she was helped by Doctor Mannen Matsumoto, a specialist in Chinese medicine and professor of the same. Dr. Matsumoto assisted Ogino in the initial phase of her recovery with herbal remedies. During her convalescence, she became acquainted with Dr. Matsumoto's daughter, who was also interested in the role and impact that women played in Japanese society of that time, becoming her mentor.

After the initial treatment with traditional Chinese medicine, Ogino found solid help in doctor Shochu Sato, who instead treated her with Western medicine. Ogino was stunned by these innovative treatments, and became increasingly interested in Western medicine as it was based on observation and pragmatism, which was an extremely distant concept from Chinese medicine. For example, human dissections able to give a more detailed explanation and a more precise investigation of the human body, would have never been admitted by the more traditional Oriental medicine.

During this time, Ogino often felt ashamed of her disease, and being seen by male doctors only aggravated this feeling. Therefore, after this experience she decided to become a doctor herself, in order to help women in the same situation as her and to build spaces to raise awareness of women’s health. It was during this period that she understood that often, doctors' arrogance toward patients led to mistakes in the evaluation of disease, and she therefore decided to consider the patient’s perspective and history, in order to provide a more integrated diagnosis.

Finally, it is worth noting her change of name as soon as she was admitted into Tokyo Women's Normal School. There was a Japanese tradition at the time which dictated the assignment of short names to women, for the purpose of giving them orders more easily. She changed her original name (Gin) to Ginko, adding a character to it and taking another step forward for gender equality.

Male support 
After having spent two years in hospital due to gonorrhea and being treated entirely by men, Ogino decided to become a doctor, as she wanted to give women the option of being treated by other women. This idea probably came about because at the time, girls had just started to stand up for their opinions and their education. During the Meiji period, many people still thought that the female mind was weaker than the male one, and that applying the same standards to male and female higher education could be deleterious — although many male intellectuals supported the struggle for women's independence.

In fact, while before the Meiji period women were often considered incompetent in the raising of children, the Meiji period saw motherhood as the central task of women, and allowed education of women toward this end.

Ogino was lucky enough in 1873 to be able to enter Tokyo Joshi Shihan Gakko, where she won the support of one of her teachers, who, knowing that she aspired to become a doctor, helped her enroll in a private medical school. Usually, after having undergone medical school, male students were allowed to sit an exam to be able to fully practice medicine. Ogino was the first woman to be able to sit for this exam, and she eventually earned the license to practice medicine in 1885. She succeeded in this achievement only thanks to her connections to influential male doctors, such as Iwamoto Yoshiharu and Inoue, who were the most prominent supporters of female empowerment. As she triumphed in this field, other women had just started to follow her path and become female doctors, enlarging the community of women willing to pursue this career. In this way, Ogino became a clear example of the growing emancipation of Japanese women.

Death 

Ogino Ginko died of atherosclerosis on June 23, 1913, in Tokyo, aged 63. Her body is buried at Zoshigaya Cemetery in Tokyo.

See also 
 Kei Okami, who graduated from the Women's Medical College of Pennsylvania in 1889.

References

Further reading
 
 
 
 
 
 

1851 births
1913 deaths
19th-century Japanese physicians
20th-century Japanese physicians
Ochanomizu University alumni
Japanese Protestants
People from Saitama Prefecture
People of Meiji-period Japan
Japanese women physicians
20th-century women physicians
19th-century women physicians
19th-century Japanese women